Lindmania lateralis is a plant species in the genus Lindmania. This species is endemic to Venezuela.

References 

lateralis
Flora of Venezuela